Pist.On (also spelled Pist*On, Pist-On, Pist•On, PistOn, and Piston) is an American heavy metal band from Staten Island, New York. The band released two albums in the 1990s. They split up in 2001 but announced a reunion in 2015.

History

Original members 
Formed around the core duo of Henry Font (vocals, guitars) and Val.Ium (bass, backing vocals), the band released two demos in the early 1990s, the second of which, Urine the Money, was produced by Josh Silver of Type O Negative. The band's friendship with Type O Negative (also based out of Brooklyn) brought them both help and scorn in subsequent years.

In 1996 the band, now rounded out by Paul Poulos (guitars, backing vocals) and Danny "Jam" Kavadlo (drums), released their first full-length album, Number One, to critical acclaim in both the United States and Europe. Subsequent tours with Type O Negative and Marilyn Manson helped improve the band's notoriety. Within a year, they moved from the independent Mayhem/Fierce record label to a major label, Atlantic Records. Also around this time, Poulos and Kavadlo both left the band.

Second lineup 
New members Burton Gans (guitars) and Jeff McManus (drums) joined in time to see an Atlantic rerelease of Number One with new photos, artwork, and, perhaps most obvious of all, spelling; the band's name shifted from "Pist.On" to the "friendlier" spelling "PistOn". The removal of the "." led to criticism that the band had "sold out". Under the guise of their new name and label, the band again toured exhaustively. During this time, drummer Jeff McManus was forced into a brief respite for medical reasons, with Johnny Kelly of Type O Negative filling in.

1996–1997 
Pist.on's debut album, successful on its face, had been picked up and rereleased by a major label, the band had deep friendships and histories with well-known acts such as Type O Negative, Marilyn Manson, the Misfits, and Queensrÿche, and had energetic new blood in the form of two members. However, the promises and possibilities of this era never panned out, and after a handful of tours and negative reviews, the band was unceremoniously dropped by Atlantic.

Second release 
1999 saw the release of the band's second album, again through Mayhem Records. The record was described as rife with crooked and spiteful poking at the music industry, the band's former label, the press, and the band itself. The album met with lukewarm reviews and sales, and breakup rumors swirled.

Breakup 
After the band's second release, drummer Jeff McManus departed from the band, returning briefly to record a 3-song independent Saves EP in the spring of 2001. Despite the optimism brought on by Saves, the core duo of Pist.On broke apart in late August 2001 when bassist Val Ium decided to leave the band as well. Though still not officially broken up, Pist.On has not released any new material as a band since, although several band members including Henry Font and Jeff McManus have released recordings independently.

Reunion 
As of March 2015, Pist.On has reformed and they are working on new material.

In early October 2017, Pist.On announced their formal reformation and a UK Tour with seven dates in June 2018

Pist.On released an EP, Cold World EP, on March 25, 2022, making it the band's first new studio recording since 2001.

Members

Current members 
 Henry Font – vocals, guitars (1993–2001, 2015–present)
 Burton Gans – guitars (1996–2001, 2015–present)
 Jeff McManus – drums (1996–2001, 2015–present)
 Jack Hanley – bass (2015–present)

Former members 
 Val Ium – bass, backing vocals (1993–2001)
 Danny "Jam" Kavadlo – drums (1993–1996)
 Paul Poulos – guitar, backing vocals (1993–1996)

Touring members 
 Johnny Kelly – drums

Discography 

Studio albums
 Number One (1996)
  (1999)

EPs
 Saves (2001)
 Cold World EP (2022)

Demos
 First Demo Tape (1993)
 Urine the Money (1993)

Solo projects in the 2000s 
Henry Font
"SumMerFlu"
Jeff McManus
"Weekends with Dan" (released the single Anna Rexia in 2006 which received acclaim in several punk rock publications)
Burton Gans
"American Popular"
"The Deadlyz" (released self-titled debut album in 2009, followed up by second studio album Fabulous Disaster in 2011)

References 

Musical groups established in 1993
Musical groups disestablished in 2001
Musical groups reestablished in 2015
American gothic metal musical groups
Heavy metal musical groups from New York (state)
Musical groups from Brooklyn